William L. Roper (born 1948) is an American physician who served as the director of the Centers for Disease Control and Prevention (CDC) from 1990 to 1993, when he was asked to step down over controversy about his response to the AIDS crisis.

After leaving the CDC, he joined the faculty at the University of North Carolina at Chapel Hill, and then served as CEO of UNC Health Care. He was the dean of the UNC Gillings School of Global Public Health and the UNC School of Medicine before being appointed interim president of the University of North Carolina in January 2019. In June 2020, it was announced that he would be succeeded by Peter Hans in August.

Roper received his medical degree from the University of Alabama School of Medicine, and his master of public health degree from the same university.

A former White House Fellow and head of the Health Care Financing Administration, he was moved from his position as head of the Office of Policy Development, in the White House, to the CDC at the beginning of March 1990.

References

Directors of the Centers for Disease Control and Prevention
Presidents of the University of North Carolina System
University of Alabama School of Medicine alumni
White House Fellows
1948 births
George H. W. Bush administration personnel
American health care chief executives
American public health doctors
University of North Carolina faculty
Living people
Hueytown High School alumni
Clinton administration personnel